Five-point electoral law, of five-adjectives election is a concept used in Polish political science referring to the elections that are:
 universal
 direct
 equal
 proportional
 anonymous (secret ballot).

A similar concept is used in elections to the Israeli Knesset, with a sixth adjective, "national (No constituencies)", added, and "general" used instead of "universal".

References 

Google Books

Elections in Poland
Law of Poland